The 2010 Philippine Basketball Association (PBA) rookie draft was an event held at Market! Market! in Taguig on August 29, 2010 that allowed PBA teams to draft players from the amateur ranks. Players who applied for the draft went through a rookie camp that lasted a week. The San Miguel Beermen were the only team that did not have a single pick in the draft.

Draft lottery 
The lottery was held on August 6, 2010, before the start of the 2010 PBA Fiesta Conference Finals at the Araneta Coliseum in Quezon City. The Air21 Express beat the statistical odds by winning the first overall pick against Barako Energy Coffee Masters (draft pick was already acquired by Talk 'N Text during the draft lottery).

Draft 

Notes:
  Given by the PBA board to the Meralco Bolts as an incentive of being a new team.
  Powerade Tigers passed on what was their 19th overall pick.
  Air21 Express passed on what was their 20th overall pick.

Trades involving draft picks

Pre-draft trades 
Prior to the day of the draft, the following trades were made and resulted in exchanges of draft picks between the teams.
 On October 12, 2009, in a three-team trade, Air21 (as Burger King) acquired a first round pick and a 2012 first round pick from Barako Energy Coffee via Talk 'N Text, and 2012 and 2013 first round picks from the Tropang Texters; the Coffee Masters acquired Orlando Daroya from the Tropang Texters; and the Tropang Texters acquired Japeth Aguilar from the Whoppers. Aguilar was on loan to the national team (Gilas) at that time.
  On August 20, 2010, in a three-team trade, Talk 'N Text acquired a first round pick from Air21, the Express acquired Josh Urbiztondo and a first round pick from Meralco, and the Bolts acquired Mark Cardona from the Tropang Texters via the Express. Previously, Sta. Lucia acquired the pick and Chris Ross on May 19, 2010, from Powerade (as Coca-Cola) in exchange for Paolo Mendoza. The Realtors franchise was sold to Meralco in the 2010 off-season.
  On March 3, 2010, Air21 acquired a first round pick, Yancy de Ocampo and Renren Ritualo from Talk 'N Text in exchange for J. R. Quiñahan, Mark Yee and Aaron Aban.
  On February 10, 2009, Barako Bull acquired a second round pick from Barangay Ginebra in exchange for Alex Crisano.
  In November 2008, Barangay Ginebra acquired a first round pick from Barako Bull in exchange for Mike Holper. Previously, Barako Bull previously acquired the pick from San Miguel during the 2008 off-season in exchange for Mick Pennisi.
  On September 1, 2008, Alaska acquired Joe Devance and 2009 and 2010 second round picks from Rain or Shine in exchange for Eddie Laure and the draft rights to Sol Mercado.
  On May 12, 2010, Barako Bull acquired a second round pick and Mark Isip from Talk 'N Text in a three-team trade with Sta. Lucia. The Tropang Texters acquired Kelly Williams, Ryan Reyes and Charles Waters from Sta. Lucia, and the Realtors acquired Ali Peek, Nic Belasco, Pong Escobal, Rogemar Menor and Yousif Aljamal from Talk 'N Text.

Draft-day trades 
  The Alaska Aces acquired the draft rights to 4th pick Elmer Espiritu from Talk 'N Text in exchange for Larry Fonacier.
  The Meralco Bolts acquired the draft rights to 10th pick of Alaska and picks Shawn Weinstein in exchange for Bonbon Custodio.
  The Rain or Shine Elasto Painters acquired the draft rights of 15th pick of Alaska and picks RJ Jazul in exchange for a 2011 second round pick.
  The Powerade Tigers acquired the draft rights to 18th pick Jai Reyes, Ren-Ren Ritualo and newly drafted rookie Sean Anthony from Air21 in exchange for a 2011 second round pick and a 2012 first round picks

References

External links 
 PBA.ph

Draft
Philippine Basketball Association draft